The Military Medal For Gallantry (MMG) is a military decoration awarded by the Government of Ireland.  It is the highest award of the military awards and decorations of Ireland.

History
Created in 1944, the Military Medal for Gallantry is awarded in three different classes.  Originally referred to as 1st, 2nd  and 3rd class, but since 1984 they have been respectively been referred to with Honour, with Distinction, and with Merit.  Since the medal's inception it has been awarded six times with Distinction and twice with Merit.  It has never yet been awarded with Honour.

Criteria
The Military Medal for Gallantry is awarded for "any act of exceptional bravery or gallantry (other than one  performed on war service) arising out of, or associated with, military service and involving risk to life and limb."  The medal can be awarded to officers, non-commissioned officers, or privates/seaman/aircrew of the Defence Forces and to members of the Army Nursing Service and Chaplaincy Services.

Appearance
The medal is made of silver when awarded with Honour and is bronze when awarded with Distinction and Merit.  The obverse of the medal depicts a cross with St. Brendan's knot on each arm.  Superimposed on the cross is a laurel wreath.  In the centre are the words DE ḂARR CALMAĊTA (For Gallantry).  The reverse is plain except for the inscription An Bonn Míleata Calmaċta arching over a scroll on which to inscribes the recipient's name. The maker's hallmark is located at the bottom.

The medal hangs from a straight arm suspension attached to a  ribbon which is green and crimson.  The ribbon for the medal with Honour is green with a  central stripe of crimson, while the medal with Distinction is green with  stripes of crimson at the edges, and the medal with Merit is green with 3-millimetre crimson edges and a 3-millimetre crimson central stripe.

Subsequent awards of the medal are denoted by a  metal disc bearing a Celtic triquetra design.

Recipients
There have only been eight recipients of the Military Medal for Gallantry, of which 6 have received it with Distinction (2nd class) and 2 with Merit (3rd class).

References

by BQMS Ger O'Connor 54 Reserve Artillery Regiment Mullingar 2010

Orders, decorations, and medals of Ireland
Courage awards
Awards established in 1944
1944 establishments in Ireland